Devendra Sharma is an Indian politician, currently serving as a Member of Legislative Assembly. He is one of the strong leaders of Odisha Pradesh Congress Committee and a member of Opposition in the Odisha Legislative Assembly. He is the 15th MLA, elected from the Aul constituency in 2014. He belongs to the Indian National Congress party.

Early life

Sharma was born in Cuttack, Odisha to Dr. Dibakar Sharma, Ex-MLA Aul and Kumari Kamala Devi. He studied at Ravenshaw Collegiate School, Cuttack. He studied law at Mayurbhanj Law College and graduated in 1982. Sharma is the grandson of Kabiraj Jagannath Sharma.

Political career

Sharma followed in the footsteps of his father and is currently the Member of the Legislative Assembly from Aul, Odisha. He heads the district congress association, Kendrapara, and is a member of AICC and OPCC.

Sports

Sharma is an active member of the Odisha cricket association and president of the district cricket association, Kendrapara. He is mainly known in India and Odisha for his work in the field of football as he is responsible for the recognition of many star female Indian footballers such as Sasmita Malick.

Social work

He runs Dr. Dibakar Sharma girls' high school meant for educating poor girls, and also runs Satya Sai School for the poor in Aul. He is also the President of Aul College.

Personal life

Sharma married Kumari Anita Devi of Raj Korkor, on 1 July 1993, the daughter of Zamindar Gagananda Rout Bahadur and Kumari Atara Devi of Payara. They have one child, a daughter named Debasmita Sharma. Sharma is a doctor by profession having completed her MBBS from Indore, Madhya pradesh and schooling from four respected schools in Shimla, Bhubaneswar in India and United Kingdom.

References

1959 births
Living people
Indian National Congress politicians
Indian Hindus
People from Cuttack